Brannen is a surname. Notable people with the surname include:

John Brannen (born 1974), American basketball coach
John Brannen (singer) (born 1952), American roots rock/ heartland rock, singer-songwriter
Julia Brannen, British sociologist
Karen Fuller Brannen, United States Marine Corps female fighter strike pilot
Nathan Brannen (born 1982), Canadian middle-distance runner
Paul Brannen (born 1962), British politician